Mamood Amadu (born 17 November 1972) is a football player from Ghana, who was a member of the Men's National Team that won the bronze medal at the 1992 Summer Olympics in Barcelona, Spain. He played as a striker.

References

External links
 
 
 

1972 births
Living people
Ghanaian footballers
Footballers at the 1992 Summer Olympics
Olympic footballers of Ghana
Olympic bronze medalists for Ghana
Place of birth missing (living people)
Olympic medalists in football
Medalists at the 1992 Summer Olympics
Association football forwards